I with grave (Ѝ ѝ; italics: Ѝ ù) is a character representing a stressed variant of the regular letter  in some Cyrillic alphabets, but none of them, whether modern or archaic, includes it as a separate letter.

South Slavic languages

Bulgarian and Macedonian 
Most regularly  is used in Bulgarian and Macedonian languages to distinguish the short form of the indirect object  ("her") from the conjunction  ("and", "also") or, less frequently, to prevent ambiguity in other similar cases. If it is not available, the character  is often replaced by an ordinary  (not recommended but still orthographically correct) or in Bulgarian by the letter  (formally considered a spelling error).

Church Slavonic 
Since the 17th century in the modern Russian recension of Church Slavonic,  and any other vowel with a grave accent is just an orthographic variant of the same letter with an acute accent when it is used as the last letter of a word.

Serbian 
 (as well as other vowels with an acute, grave, circumflex, or double grave accents) can be optionally used in Serbian texts to show one of four possible tones of the stressed syllable. In cases like прѝкупити ('to gather') vs. прику́пити ('to purchase more'), or ѝскуп ('redemption' 'ransom') vs. и̏скуп ('meeting'), the usage of diacritics can also prevent ambiguity. In the Latin Serbo-Croatian alphabet (the so-called Gajevica), all stress/tone marks are the same: Cyrillic  corresponds to Latin , etc.

East Slavic languages 
 and any other vowel with grave accent can be found in older Russian and Ukrainian books as stressed variants of regular (unaccented) vowels until the early 20th century, like Russian вѝна ('wines') vs. вина̀ ('guilt'). Recently, East Slavonic typographies have begun using the acute accent (ви́на) instead of the grave accent (вина́) to denote stress.

Stress marks are optional in East Slavic languages and are regularly used only in special books like dictionaries, primers, or textbooks for foreigners, as stress is very unpredictable in all three languages. However, in general texts, stress marks are hardly ever used and then mainly to prevent ambiguity or to show the pronunciation of foreign words.

Some modern Russian dictionaries use a grave accent to denote the secondary stress in compound words, with an acute accent for the main stress, like жѝзнеспосо́бный  ('viable') (from жизнь  'life' and способный  'capable').

"Decimal" I with grave

Related letters and other similar characters
И и : Cyrillic letter I
И́ и́ : Cyrillic letter I with acute
Й й : Cyrillic letter Short I
І і : Cyrillic letter Dotted I
Ї ї : Cyrillic letter Yi
I i : Latin letter I
Ì ì : Latin letter I with grave — a variant of  used in languages including Italian, Scottish Gaelic and Welsh.

Computing codes

References

Cyrillic letters with diacritics
Letters with grave